The 1981 Avon Championships of Detroit  was a women's tennis tournament played on indoor carpet courts at the Cobo Hall & Arena  in Detroit, Michigan in the United States that was part of the 1981 Avon Championships circuit. It was the tenth edition of the tournament and was held from February 2 through February 8, 1981. Unseeded Leslie Allen won the singles title and earned $24,000 first-prize money.

Finals

Singles

 Leslie Allen defeated  Hana Mandlíková 6–4, 6–4
 It was Allen's only singles title of her career.

Doubles
 Rosemary Casals /  Wendy Turnbull defeated  Hana Mandlíková /  Betty Stöve 6–4, 6–2

Prize money

Notes

References

External links
 International Tennis Federation (ITF) tournament edition details

Avon Championships of Detroit
Virginia Slims of Detroit
1981 in sports in Michigan
February 1981 sports events in the United States
1981 in Detroit